Erick López Barriga (born 14 May 1971) is a Mexican politician from the Party of the Democratic Revolution. From 2006 to 2009, he served as Deputy of the LX Legislature of the Mexican Congress representing Michoacán.

References

1971 births
Living people
People from Morelia
Politicians from Michoacán
Party of the Democratic Revolution politicians
21st-century Mexican politicians
Universidad Michoacana de San Nicolás de Hidalgo alumni
University of Texas at Austin alumni
Academic staff of Universidad Michoacana de San Nicolás de Hidalgo
Deputies of the LX Legislature of Mexico
Members of the Chamber of Deputies (Mexico) for Michoacán